Hong Kong Cantonese is a dialect of the Cantonese language of the Sino-Tibetan family. 

Although Hongkongers refer to the language as "Cantonese", publications in mainland China describe the variant as Hong Kong dialect, due to the differences between the pronunciation used in Hong Kong Cantonese and that of the Cantonese spoken in neighbouring Guangdong Province where Cantonese (based on the Guangzhou dialect) is a lingua franca.

Over the years, Hong Kong Cantonese has also absorbed foreign terminology and developed a large set of Hong Kong-specific terms. Code-switching with English is also common. These are the result of British rule between 1841 and 1997, as well as the closure of the Hong Kong–mainland China border immediately after the establishment of the People's Republic of China in 1949.

History

Before the arrival of British settlers in 1842, the inhabitants of Hong Kong mainly spoke the Dongguan-Bao'an (Tungkun–Po'on) and Tanka dialects of Yue, as well as Hakka and Teochew. These languages and dialects are all remarkably different from Guangzhou Cantonese, and not mutually intelligble.

After the British acquired Hong Kong Island, Kowloon Peninsula and the New Territories from the Qing in 1841 (officially 1842) and 1898, large numbers  of merchants and workers came to Hong Kong from the city of Canton, the main centre of Cantonese. Cantonese became the dominant spoken language in Hong Kong. The extensive migration from mainland Cantonese-speaking areas to Hong Kong continued up until 1949, when the Communists took over mainland China.

In 1949, the year that the People's Republic of China was established, Hong Kong saw a large influx of refugees from mainland China, prompting the Hong Kong Government to close its border. Illegal immigration from mainland China into Hong Kong nevertheless continued. During the 1950s, the Cantonese spoken in Hong Kong remained very similar to that in Canton, but the proportion of Cantonese speakers did not surpass 50% of the population in Hong Kong.

Movement, communication and relations between Hong Kong and mainland China became very limited, and consequently the evolution of Cantonese in Hong Kong diverged from that of Guangzhou. In mainland China, the use of Mandarin as the official language and in education was enforced. In Hong Kong, Cantonese is the medium of instruction in schools, along with written English and written Chinese. As such, since the 1970s the percentage of Cantonese speakers in Hong Kong has risen to about 90%.

Because of the long exposure to English during the colonial period, a large number of English words were loaned into Hong Kong Cantonese, e.g. "巴士" (IPA: /páːsǐː/, Cantonese Jyutping: baa1 si2), from the English "bus"; compare this with the equivalent from Standard Mandarin, 公共汽車 (Simplified Chinese: 公共汽车, Cantonese Jyutping: gung1 gung6 hei3 ce1, Mandarin Pinyin: gōnggòng qìchē). Consequently, the vocabularies of Cantonese in mainland China and Hong Kong substantially differ. Moreover, the pronunciation of Cantonese changed while the change either did not occur in mainland China or took place much more slowly.

Phonology
In modern-day Hong Kong, many native speakers no longer distinguish between certain phoneme pairs, leading to instances of sound change through mergers. Although considered non-standard and denounced as "lazy sound" by purists, the phenomena are widespread and not restricted to Hong Kong. Contrary to impressions, some of these changes are not recent. The loss of the velar nasal was documented by Williams (1856), and the substitution of the liquid nasal for the nasal initial was documented by Cowles (1914). 

List of observed shifts:
Merging of  initial into  initial.
Merging of  initial into null initial.
Note that  is the only glide in Cantonese.
Merging of the rising tones (陰上 2nd and 陽上 5th).

In educated Hong Kong Cantonese speech, these sound mergers are avoided, and many older speakers still distinguish between those phoneme categories.

The shift affects the way some Hong Kong people speak other languages as well. This is especially evident in the pronunciation of certain English names: "Nicole" pronounce , "Nancy" pronounce  etc. Even though the standard pronunciation should be , the word is often pronounced , which is the surname , or the word , meaning theory.

Prescriptivists who try to correct these "lazy sounds" often end up introducing hypercorrections. For instance, while attempting to ensure that people pronounce the initial , they may introduce it into words which have historically had a null-initial. One common example is that of the word , meaning "love", where even though the standard pronunciation is Jyutping: , IPA: , the word is often pronounced Jyutping: , . A similar phenomenon occurs in various Mandarin dialects (e.g. Southwestern Mandarin).

Unique phrases and expressions

Hong Kong Cantonese has developed a number of phrases and expressions that are unique to the context of Hong Kong. Examples are:

Loanwords
Life in Hong Kong is characterised by the blending of southern Chinese with other Asian and Western cultures, as well as the city's position as a major international business centre. In turn, Hong Kong influences have spread widely into other cultures. As a result, a large number of loanwords are created in Hong Kong and then exported to mainland China, Taiwan, Singapore, and Japan. Some of the loanwords have become even more popular than their Chinese counterparts, in Hong Kong as well as in their destination cultures.

Imported loanwords
Selected loanwords are shown below.

From English

From French

From Japanese

Exported loanwords

Into English

Into Mainland Chinese Mandarin

Into Taiwanese Mandarin

Into Japanese

Code-switching and loanword adaptation

Hong Kong Cantonese has a high number of foreign loanwords. Sometimes, the parts of speech of the incorporated words are changed. In some examples, some new meanings of English words are even created. For example, "至yeah", literally "the most yeah", means "the trendiest". Originally, "yeah" means "yes/okay" in English, but it means "trendy" when being incorporated into Hong Kong Cantonese (Cf. "yeah baby" and French "yé-yé").

Semantic change is common in loanwords; when foreign words are borrowed into Cantonese, polysyllabic words and monosyllabic words tend to become disyllabic, and the second syllable is in the Upper Rising tone (the second tone). For example, "kon1 si2"  (coins), "sek6 kiu1" (security) and "ka1 si2" (cast). A few polysyllabic words become monosyllabic though, like "mon1" (monitor), literally means computer monitor. And some new Cantonese lexical items are created according to the morphology of Cantonese. For example, "laai1 記" from the word "library". Most of the disyllabic words and some of the monosyllabic words are incorporated as their original pronunciation, with some minor changes according to the Cantonese phonotactics.

Incorporating words from foreign languages into Cantonese is acceptable to most Cantonese speakers. Hong Kong Cantonese speakers frequently code-mix although they can distinguish foreign words from Cantonese ones. For instance, "噉都唔 make sense", literally means "that doesn't make sense". After a Cantonese speaker decides to code-mix a foreign word in a Cantonese sentence, syntactical rules of Cantonese will be followed. For instance, "sure" (肯定) can be used like "你 su1 唔 su1 aa3?" (are you sure?) as if it were its Cantonese counterpart "你肯唔肯定?", using the A-not-A question construction.

In some circumstances, code-mixing is preferable because it can simplify sentences. An excellent example (though dated) of the convenience and efficiency of such mixing is "打 collect call" replacing "打一個由對方付款嘅長途電話", i.e. 13 syllables reduced to four.

Short-text adaptations

Abbreviation 
Abbreviations are commonly used in Hong Kong and have flourished with the use of short messaging over the Internet.  Some examples:

See also

Bilingualism in Hong Kong
Cantonese profanity
Code-switching in Hong Kong
Proper Cantonese pronunciation
Comparison of national standards of Chinese
Hong Kong English
The Linguistic Society of Hong Kong, whose Cantonese Romanization Scheme is known as Jyutping
Varieties of Chinese

References

Further reading

External links
Learn Cantonese (with Cantonese-English / English-Cantonese Dictionary)
Learn Chinese with Chinese Lyrics Now with Pinyin and sound files
Jyutping romanisation of Cantonese reading of Chinese characters using in Hong Kong

Languages of Hong Kong
Cantonese language
City colloquials